Resistance is a Star Trek: The Next Generation novel set after the 2002 film Star Trek: Nemesis, aboard the USS Enterprise-E. The book takes place in the Star Trek universe in the 24th century, based on the hit television show and features characters from it.

Plot
Picard must rebuild his crew after the death of Data and departure of Capt. William Riker and Counselor Troi. Picard selects newly promoted, and acting first officer, Commander Worf as permanent first officer. A Vulcan, T'Lana, is granted commission as the Enterprise's new counselor. The captain is looking forward to putting the devastation of war behind him, shaping his new crew, building his relationship with Dr. Beverly Crusher and returning at last to being an explorer. Worf refuses the promotion and Picard senses his new counselor does not approve of Worf.

Quickly after being assigned a simple shakedown mission for the restored U.S.S. Enterprise-E, Picard once again begins hearing the voice of the Borg Collective. After reporting this to Starfleet, Admiral Janeway feels the Borg are decimated and are no longer a threat. Picard knows she is wrong and  believes they are regrouping in the Alpha Quadrant for an annihilation-style attack on the Federation and all of the Alpha Quadrant's inhabitants.

References

External links
 Resistance Internet Archive, Books to Borrow

2007 American novels
Novels based on Star Trek: The Next Generation